<noinclude>

The Battles of Sievierodonetsk were a series of battles between Ukrainian troops and Luhansk People's Republic formations during the War in Donbas in and around the Eastern Ukrainian cluster of cities of Rubizhne, Lysychansk, and Sieverodonetsk for control. Although the battle derives its namesake from the city, there was no fighting in Sieverodonetsk itself, in comparison to the successive battle in 2022.

Timeline 

At the end of May 2014, there was heavy fighting between LPR separatists and units of the National Guard of Ukraine. The media reported on the use by the Ukrainian army of mortars, howitzers, Tulpan self-propelled mortars and Grad multiple launch rocket systems.

On 22 July 2014 the LPR separatists retreated from Severodonetsk. Units of the National Guard of Ukraine entered the city.

As of 23 July 2014, the Armed Forces of Ukraine and the National Guard of Ukraine continued to engage in street fighting with the separatists. According to the fighters of the National Guard, they found one howitzer, more than 50 kilograms of plastids, 15 high-explosive shells and other ammunition in the city. .

References 

Sievierodonetsk
Sievierodonetsk
Sievierodonetsk
2014 in Ukraine
Battles involving the Luhansk People's Republic